DMZ is a demilitarized zone, a buffer zone between military powers.

DMZ may also refer to:

Science and technology
 DMZ (computing), a demilitarized zone in network computing
 DMZGlobal, a security division of Vodafone
 Dimethylzinc, a chemical

Arts and media

Comics
 DMZ (comics), an American comic book series
 DMZ, a character in the Blood Syndicate universe

Music
 DMZ (band), a 1970s Boston punk band
 DMZ (DMZ album), 1978
 A dubstep record label and clubnight, run by Digital Mystikz
 D.M.Z. (Resurrection Band album), a 1982 album by Resurrection Band

Television
 DMZ (miniseries), a miniseries based on the comic book

Other uses
 Korean Demilitarized Zone, across the Korean Peninsula
 DMZ International Documentary Film Festival, a South Korean documentary film festival
 The DMZ (Toronto Metropolitan University), (formerly the Digital Media Zone), Toronto Metropolitan University's business incubator for early-stage technology startups
 Deutsche Militärzeitschrift, a german military magazine, with a tendency to right-extremism and historical revisionism.